Ellicott may refer to:

People
In England
Charles Ellicott (1819–1905), Anglican churchman, Bishop of Gloucester and Bristol
John Ellicott (clockmaker) (1706–1772), English clock and watchmaker
Rosalind Ellicott (1857–1924), English composer
In the United States
Andrew Ellicott (miller) (1733–1809)
Andrew Ellicott (surveyor) (1754–1820), influential surveyor, son of the above
Elizabeth King Ellicott (1858–1914), suffragist
Henry Jackson Ellicott (1847–1901), sculptor, great-grandson of Andrew Ellicott (surveyor).
John Ellicott (miller) (1739–1794), son of Andrew Ellicott.
Joseph Ellicott (miller) (1732–1780), together with his brothers John and Andrew, founded Ellicott's Mills, Maryland in 1772
Joseph Ellicott (surveyor) (1760–1826), surveyor and land agent for the Holland Land Company, son of Joseph Ellicott (miller).
Ellicott R. Stillman (1844–1911), American politician

Places
Ellicott City, Maryland, a census-defined place, formerly Ellicott's Mills,  named after its founders
Ellicott, Colorado, a town 
Ellicott Complex, a dormitory at the University at Buffalo
Ellicott Creek, a stream in Western New York
Ellicott, New York, a town in Chautauqua County
Ellicott Rock Wilderness, named for Ellicott Rock, on the east bank of the Chattooga River on which surveyor Andrew Ellicott chiseled a mark in 1811 to determine the border between Georgia and North Carolina
Ellicottville (village), New York, in Cattaraugus County
Ellicottville (town), New York, in Cattaraugus County

Other uses
Ellicott Square Building, in Buffalo, New York

Ellicott Dredges, American manufacturer

See also